Trepetlika Glacier is the 8 km long and 3.5 km wide glacier on the south side of Sonketa Ridge in the west foothills of Detroit Plateau on Danco Coast in Graham Land, Antarctica.  It drains the northwest slopes of Razhana Buttress, flows westwards and enters Brialmont Cove north of the terminus of Mouillard Glacier.

The glacier is named after the settlement of Trepetlika in Southeastern Bulgaria.

Location
British mapping in 1978.

Maps
British Antarctic Territory. Scale 1:200000 topographic map. DOS 610 Series, Sheet W 64 60. Directorate of Overseas Surveys, Tolworth, UK, 1978.
 Antarctic Digital Database (ADD). Scale 1:250000 topographic map of Antarctica. Scientific Committee on Antarctic Research (SCAR). Since 1993, regularly upgraded and updated.

References
 Bulgarian Antarctic Gazetteer. Antarctic Place-names Commission. (details in Bulgarian, basic data in English)
Trepetlika Glacier. SCAR Composite Gazetteer of Antarctica.

External links
 Trepetlika Glacier. Copernix satellite image

Bulgaria and the Antarctic
Glaciers of Danco Coast